Cigaritis crustaria, the violet silverline, is a butterfly in the family Lycaenidae. It is found in Ghana (the Volta Region), Nigeria, Cameroon, Gabon, the Central African Republic, the Democratic Republic of the Congo, eastern Uganda and north-western Tanzania. The habitat consists of forests.

Adults are attracted to flowers.

References

External links
Die Gross-Schmetterlinge der Erde 13: Die Afrikanischen Tagfalter. Plate XIII 69 h

Butterflies described in 1890
Cigaritis
Butterflies of Africa